Togarmah (Hebrew:  Tōgarmā,  Targāmos) is a figure in the "table of nations" in Genesis 10, the list of descendants of Noah that represents the peoples known to the ancient Hebrews. Togarmah is among the descendants of Japheth and is thought to represent some people located in Anatolia. Medieval sources claimed that Togarmah was the legendary ancestor of several peoples of the Caucasus (including Armenians and Georgians) as well as several Turkic peoples.

Biblical attestations and historical geography 
The name is again mentioned in the Book of Ezekiel as a nation from the "far north".  mentions Togarmah together with Tubal as supplying soldiers to the army of Gog.  mentions Togarmah together with Tubal, Javan and Meshech as supplying horses to the Tyrians.

Most scholars identify Togarmah with the capital city called Tegarama by the Hittites and Til-Garimmu by the Assyrians. O.R. Gurney placed Tegarama in Southeast Anatolia.

Later traditions
Several later ethnological traditions have claimed Togarmah as the legendary ancestor of various peoples located in western Asia and the Caucasus. Jewish historian Flavius Josephus (37 – c. 100 AD) and the Christian theologians Jerome (c. 347 – 420 AD) and Isidore of Seville (c. 560 – 636 AD) regarded Togarmah as the father of the Phrygians. Several ancient Christian authors, including Saint Hippolytus (c. 170-c. 236 AD), Eusebius of Caesarea (c. 263 – c. 339 AD), and bishop Theodoret (c. 393 – c. 457 AD), regarded him as a father of Armenians. Medieval Jewish traditions linked him with several peoples: Turkic, including the Khazars.

Armenian and Georgian traditions
Another Togarmah, this one being the son of both Tiras and Gomer, is mentioned by Armenian Moses of Chorene (c. 480) and Georgian Leonti Mroveli who regarded Togarmah as the founder of their nations along with other Caucasian peoples.

According to Moses of Chorene's History of Armenia and to Leonti Mroveli's medieval Georgian Chronicles, "Thargamos" was thought to have lived in Babylon, before he received the "land between two Seas and two Mountains" (i.e. the Caucasus) in his possession. He then settled near Mount Ararat and divided his land among his sons:

 Hayk (Հայկ) - first son of Thargamos, inherited Mount Ararat and founded the Armenian nation.
 Kartlos (ქართლოსი)  - settled in north-east from Ararat, founder of Kartli (Sa'kartvelo) who united other brothers and founded the Georgian nation.
 Bardos (ancestor of the Aghbanians/Aghuanians/Aghuans)
 Movkan (ancestors of the Movkans)
 Lekos ancestors of the "Lek" tribe of the North Caucasus.
 Heros (Herans) - settled in the eastern part of Ararat
 Caucas (Kovkases) - settled beyond the Caucasus Range, ancestor of the Ingush and Chechens.
 Egros (Egers) - settled between the Black Sea and Likhi Range (Western Georgia)

Jewish traditions 
Togarmah was linked to several medieval Turkic peoples by Jewish traditions. The Khazar ruler Joseph ben Aaron (c. 960) writes in his letters:

"You ask us also in your epistle: "Of what people, of what family, and of what tribe are you?" Know that we are descended from Japhet, through his son Togarmah. I have found in the genealogical books of my ancestors that Togarmah had ten sons."

He then goes on to enumerate ten names:"The letter of Joseph the king, son of Aaron the king, the Turk-may his creator preserve him to the head of the assembly, Hasdai, the son of Isaac, son of Ezra-about 960" Medieval Sourcebook: The Medieval Jewish Kingdom of the Khazars, 740-1259 These names are reconstructed by Korobkin (1998) 

 Agyor (Orkhon Uyghurs?)
 Tiros (or scribal error for **Twrq, meaning Turks?)
 Ouvar (Avars)
 Ugin (or Uguz: possibly Oghuz Turks)
 Bisal (Pechenegs?)
 Tarna (cf. a Tarniach people who fled to the Avars from the Turks)
 Khazar (Khazars)
 Zanor (or Janur)
 Balnod (or Bulgar: Bulgars)
 Savir (Sabirs)

The anonymous Jewish author of the medieval historical chronicle Josippon lists the ten sons of Togarmas in his JosipponNissan, Ephraim (2009) "Medieval Hebrew texts and European river names" Onomàstica 5 p. 188-9 of 187-203 as follows: 

 Kwzar (כוזר) (the Khazars)
 Pyṣynq (פיצינק) (the Pechenegs)
 ˀln (אלן) (the Alans)
 Bwlgr (בולגר) (the Bulgars)
 Knbynˀ (כנבינא) (Kanbina?)
 Ṭwrq (טורק) (possibly the Göktürks)
 Bwz (בוז) (Flusser corrected this to כוז **Kwz for Ghuzz "Oghuzes", east of the Khazars) 
 Zkwk (זכוך) (Zakhukh? or זיכוס **Zykws = Zikhūs, meaning the Northwest Caucasian Zygii?Alemany, Agustí (2000). Sources on the Alans: A Critical Compilation. p. 336)
 ˀwngr (אוגר) (Ungar; either the Hungarians or the Oghurs/Onogurs)
 Tolmaṣ (תולמץ) (cf. the Pecheneg tribe Βορο-ταλμάτ < *Boru-Tolmaç mentioned by Byzantine emperor Constantine VII).

In an 11th-century Arabic translation of Josippon by a Yemenite Jew: Togorma's tribes are these: 
 al-Khazar (Khazars)
 al-Bajanāq (Pechenegs)
 al-Ās-Alān (Alans)
 al-Bulġar (Bulgars)
 [...]
 [...]
 [...]
 Khyabars (Kabars? or Sabirs? or scribal error for *Zyḵws, meaning Zygii?)
 Unjar (Hungarians or Oghurs/Onogurs)
 Ṭalmīs (cf. the Pecheneg tribe Βορο-ταλμάτ < *Boru-Tolmaç mentioned by Byzantine emperor Constantine VII).

In the Chronicles of Jerahmeel,The Chronicles of Jerahmeel at sacred-texts Ch. XXVII quote: "Togarmah branched into ten families, who are the Cuzar (###), Paṣinaq (###), Alan (###), Bulgar (###), Kanbina (###), Turq (###), Buz (###), Zakhukh (###), Ugar (###), and Tulmeṣ (###)" the three "children" are listed as:

 Abihud Shāfaṭ YaftirAnd the ten "families"The Chronicles of Jerahmeel at sacred-texts Ch. XXXI are listed as:

 Cuzar (the Khazars)
 Pasinaq (the Pechenegs)
 Alan (the Alans)
 Bulgar (the Bulgars)
 Kanbinah Turq (possibly the Göktürks)
 Buz (possibly scribal error for **Kwz, meaning Oghuz Turks)
 Zakhukh (scribal error for **Zykws, meaning Zygii?)
 Ugar (either the Hungarians or the Oghurs/Onogurs)
 Tulmes (cf. the Pecheneg tribe Βορο-ταλμάτ < *Boru-Tolmaç mentioned by Byzantine emperor Constantine VII)

Another medieval rabbinic work, the Book of Jasher,Plain text: Cumorah Project: LDS and World Classics (Based on 1840 translation; Includes translator's preface). "Chapter 10: 10v-12v". Quote: "And the children of Tugarma are ten families, and these are their names: Buzar, Parzunac, Balgar, Elicanum, Ragbib, Tarki, Bid, Zebuc, Ongal and Tilmaz" give the names:
 Buzar (possibly scribal error for Kuzar, meaning Khazars)
 Parzunac (the Pechenegs)
 Elicanum (the Alans?)
 Balgar (the Bulgars)
 Ragbib 
 Tarki (possibly the Göktürks)
 Bid (possibly scribal error for **Kuz, meaning Oghuz Turks)
 Zebuc (scribal error for Zykws, meaning Zygii?)
 Ongal (Hungarians or Oghurs/Onogurs)
 Tilmaz (cf. the Pecheneg tribe Βορο-ταλμάτ < *Boru-Tolmaç mentioned by Byzantine emperor Constantine VII)).

In the 18th century, the French Benedictine monk and scholar Calmet (1672–1757) placed Togarmah in Scythia and Turcomania'' (in the Eurasian Steppes and Central Asia).

Notes

References 

Georgian mythology
Prehistoric Armenia
Hebrew Bible nations
History of the Turkic peoples
Book of Genesis people
Japheth
Noach (parashah)